Ballot Measure 25 of 1996 was a piece of direct legislation in the U.S. state of Oregon. The measure, which was successful, requires a three-fifths supermajority in both houses of the Oregon Legislative Assembly for any revenue-raising legislation.

See also 
 Oregon Ballot Measures 47 (1996) and 50 (1997), which established a different supermajority requirement
 List of Oregon ballot measures

References 

1996 Oregon ballot measures
Initiatives in the United States